
Year 755 (DCCLV) was a common year starting on Wednesday (link will display the full calendar) of the Julian calendar. The denomination 755 for this year has been used since the early medieval period, when the Anno Domini calendar era became the prevalent method in Europe for naming years.

Events 
 By place 

 Europe 
 September – Abd al-Rahman I, a member of the Umayyad Dynasty, lands at Almuñécar in al-Andalus (modern Spain), where over the next years he will establish the Emirate of Córdoba.
 Teodato Ipato is deposed and blinded, after a 13-year reign. He is succeeded by Galla Gaulo, who usurps the ducal throne of Venice.

 Britain 
 The Anglo-Saxon Chronicle's description under this date (now dated 757), of King Sigeberht of Wessex being deposed by Cynewulf, is notably fuller than earlier entries.

 Asia 
 December 16 – General An Lushan begins the Anshi Rebellion against Emperor Xuan Zong of the Tang Dynasty (China). His army surges down from Fanyang (near modern Beijing), and moves rapidly along the Grand Canal. Meanwhile, Xuan Zong sends Feng Changqing, governor of Fanyang, to build up defenses at the eastern capital of Luoyang.
 Trisong Detsen becomes emperor of Tibet. During his reign he plays a pivotal role in the introduction of Buddhism, and the establishment of the Nyingma or "Ancient" school of Tibetan Buddhism.
 Empress Kōken introduces the Tanabata festival to Japan.

 Central America 
November 8 – K'ahk' Ukalaw Chan Chaak is installed as the new ruler of the Mayan city state of Naranjo in Guatemala and reigns until his death in 780.
 Alliances and trade between Mayan city-states have begun to break down. Malnutrition is on the rise. A diminishing of the food supply creates social upheaval and war (approximate date).

Births 
 Bello of Carcassonne, Frankish noble (approximate date)
 Wala of Corbie, Frankish noble (approximate date)
 William of Gellone, Frankish noble (approximate date)

Deaths 
 Abd al-Rahman ibn Habib al-Fihri, Arab noble
 Abu Muslim Khorasani, Persian general
 Elisedd ap Gwylog, king of Powys (Wales)
 Sunpadh, Persian rebel leader
 Zhang Xuan, Chinese painter (b. 713)

References